Xiajiang railway station is a railway station located in Xiajiang County, Ji'an, Jiangxi, China.

History
The station opened with the Beijing–Kowloon railway in 1996. In May 2007, services were cut to one passenger service in each direction per day. However, in October 2012 a more frequent service was restored.

In preparation for the opening of the Nanchang–Ganzhou high-speed railway, the station was rebuilt. The new station opened on 17 July 2019.

References

Railway stations in Jiangxi
Railway stations in China opened in 1996